The Casio SK-1 is a small sampling keyboard made by Casio in 1985. It has 32 small sized piano keys, four-note polyphony, with a sampling bit depth of 8 bit PCM and a sample rate of 9.38 kHz for 1.4 seconds, a built-in microphone and line level and microphone inputs for sampling, and an internal speaker and line out. It also features a small number of four-note polyphonic preset analog and digital instrument voices, and a simple additive voice.

All voices may be shaped by 13 preset envelopes, portamento, and vibrato.  It also includes a rudimentary sequence recorder, preset rhythms and chord accompaniment.  The SK-1 was thus an unusually full-featured synth in the sub-US$100 (equivalent to $ today) home keyboard market of the time.

The SK-1 includes one pre-arranged piece of music, the Toy Symphony, which is played when the "Demo" button is pressed.

The Radio Shack version of the Casio SK-1 is called the Realistic Concertmate 500.  

The SK line continued throughout the late 1980s, including the SK-2, SK-5, SK-8 and 8A, SK-10, SK-60, SK-100, SK-200, and SK-2100.

Use in recorded music
The SK-1 has been used by a few major recording artists for its simplicity and lo-fi sound. It became very popular in the late 1990s among the circuit bending crowd after the first guide to bending it was published by Reed Ghazala in Experimental Musical Instruments magazine, though the SK-1 was being modified as early as 1987 when Keyboard Magazine published an article on adding MIDI support.

The synthesizer was one of the first pieces of equipment that Autechre had when they began recording music. Musician and score composer Michael Andrews featured a circuit bent SK-1 heavily in the Me and You and Everyone We Know musical score. The "Realistic Concertmate" version of the SK-1 is the primary synth used in the no wave / industrial band Special Interest. It was used by notable jungle artist DJ Hype for his seminal productions, and rapper and producer Large Professor used it in his early years of beat-making. Australian band Turnstyle used the keyboard's sample function on various songs as both repetitive motifs (Happier Than Metallica) and melodic passages (Sad Rambo). Owen Ashworth used and recorded with one for Casiotone for the Painfully Alone's second live album In Sydney. Mount Eerie's Eleven Old Songs of Mount Eerie consisted solely of Phil Elverum's vocals and an SK-1, making use of its various effects and built-in rhythm machine. It is also featured on the cover of the Soccer Mommy album "Collection". Composer Samuel Andreyev has written demanding parts for the SK-1 in several of his chamber compositions, including Vérifications, Iridescent Notation and Sextet in Two Parts.

Audio Posse used the SK-1 in their single "My Rhymes Show Maturity" which drew universal acclaim in the Oakland underground hip-hop scene.  X-Prezs and Q-Ball recorded the titular sample themselves, while DJ Auxiliary inserted it into the beat he created using a drum machine and a Yamaha DX-21 keyboard.

References

External links 
 Casio SK-1 specifications and user reviews at Sonic State
 Casio SK-1 at Vintage Synth Explorer
 Information/Pictures/Manuals to various Casio  sampling keyboards at casiosk1.com
 Casio Sk-1 Polynominal.com [info, manual, mp3 demo and pictures]

SK-1
Products introduced in 1985